Allen Hutchins was an American politician who served in the Michigan House of Representatives in its first session after adoption of the state constitution.

Biography 

Allen Hutchins moved to Adrian, Michigan, in 1833 from Orleans County, New York, and practiced law there until 1836.

He was elected as a Democrat to the Michigan House of Representatives in 1835 and served as a representative from Lenawee County through 1836.
In 1836, he was appointed receiver of the land office in Ionia, Michigan. He was accused of being a defaulter while in office, and excoriated by the Whig-leaning newspapers, although he proclaimed his innocence. He returned to Adrian after his term and died a few years later.

Notes

References 
 
 
 
 

Democratic Party members of the Michigan House of Representatives
People from Adrian, Michigan
19th-century American politicians